Alfred James Clark (December 2, 1927 – March 20, 2015) was an American engineer, businessman and philanthropist. He was chairman and CEO of Clark Enterprises, Inc., headquartered in Bethesda, Maryland. The company's largest subsidiary is Clark Construction Group, LLC, one of the United States' largest construction companies, founded in 1906 as the George Hyman Construction Company.

Early life
Clark was born on December 2, 1927, in Richmond, Virginia, US, the son of a life insurance salesman father. He grew up in Bethesda, Maryland.

Clark was a 1950 graduate of the University of Maryland, College Park, where he was a member of Phi Delta Theta.

Career

In 1950, he was hired by the George Hyman Construction Company. 
In 1969, he became president. In 1977, he formed OMNI Construction, a double-breasted subsidiary.

In addition to being an engineer and business executive, Clark served as a university trustee emeritus at Johns Hopkins University.

Philanthropy
Clark has given to the University of Maryland, College Park's School of Engineering, which now bears his name.

He established the A. James Clark Engineering Scholars program at the University of Virginia, George Washington University, Duke University, Vanderbilt University, Penn State and Virginia Tech.

He donated $10 million toward the construction of the Johns Hopkins University building, "Clark Hall," which is the cornerstone of the Decker Quadrangle. His construction company served as general contractor for the building, which was named in his honor.  Also at Johns Hopkins University, He sponsored the Clark Scholars Program to fund undergraduate scholarships with a focus on leadership and service learning.

On October 4, 2017, it was announced the University of Maryland would receive almost $220 million from the A. James and Alice B. Clark Foundation.

Personal life
In 1950, Clark  married Alice Bratton. They had three children and lived in Vero Beach, Florida. He died of congestive heart failure in 2015.

Awards and honors
Golden Plate Award of the American Academy of Achievement (1987)
The University of Maryland honorary doctor of engineering degree, the Distinguished Engineering Alumnus Award, and induction into the University of Maryland Alumni Association’s Hall of Fame

References

External links
Johns Hopkins University Clark Hall dedication
Profile, forbes.com; accessed December 29, 2014.

1927 births
2015 deaths
University of Maryland, College Park alumni
American chief executives
American billionaires
Businesspeople from Richmond, Virginia
People from Bethesda, Maryland
Members of the United States National Academy of Engineering
20th-century American businesspeople